Robert E. Fitch High School is a public high school located in Groton, Connecticut.

History
The original Fitch High School (now the former location of Fitch Middle School) was built in 1928 next to the Town Hall on Poquonock Road and was funded in part by the will of a local merchant, Charles Fitch, with the stipulation that it be named after his son - Robert E. Fitch. In the early 1950s, the district enrollment was larger than the school could handle, so the school district decided to split to a junior high and senior high system. In 1954, the school district built a new school, the current Robert E. Fitch Senior High School, in its current location at the top of Fort Hill Road. It was then renamed Robert E. Fitch Junior High School.

Notable alumni and faculty
Amby Burfoot, runner
Dave Campo, National Football League (NFL) head coach
Jason Filardi, screenwriter
 Jesse Hahn, Major League Baseball (MLB) player
John J. Kelley, runner and cross country coach at the school
Fran Mainella, National Park Service Director, 2001–2006
Paul Menhart, former Major League Baseball pitcher
Matt Harvey, 7th overall pick in 2010 MLB draft to New York Mets
George Hall, Arena Football League linebacker
Samantha Urbani (Singer/ Songwriter)
Brian Anderson, Thrasher magazine's "Skater of the Year" 1999

Notes

External links
 

Buildings and structures in Groton, Connecticut
Schools in New London County, Connecticut
Public high schools in Connecticut
Educational institutions established in 1928
1928 establishments in Connecticut